Angélo Verheye Marasigan (born 14 May 1992) is a Filipino footballer who plays as a midfielder. He last played for United City in the Philippines Football League. He is also a Philippines international player.

Career

Youth
Born in Cebu City, Marasigan moved to Belgium at an early age and had his youth career at K.A.A. Gent and Zulte Waregem

Zulte Waregem II
In 2012, he joined the B-team of S.V. Zulte Waregem.

Pasargad
In January 2013, Marasigan joined United Football League club Pasargad.

Loyola
Months after his stint with Pasargad, Marasigan joined fellow UFL club Loyola.

Ceres
In September 2013, he joined United Football League Division 2 club Ceres F.C.

Ilocos United
In 2017, after his stint with Belgian lower league teams Olsa Brakel and Temse, Marasigan joined Philippines Football League club Ilocos United

Global Cebu
In January 2018, Marasigan joined fellow Philippines Football League club Global Cebu, Ilocos United announced its withdrawal from the league after failing to secure a new naming sponsor.

Return to Ceres
In February 2019, Marasigan returned to 2017 and 2018 PFL champions Ceres–Negros ahead of their 2019 AFC Champions League qualifiers against Yangon United.

International career

Youth
In 2013, Marasigan was called up for the Philippines U-20.

Philippines
Marasigan was called up for the Philippines in November 2017, he was included in the 23-man squad that will participate in the CTFA International Tournament.

Marasigan was once again called up for the Philippines in October 2018, he was included in the final 21-man squad that will participate in the 2018 Bangabandhu Cup.

References

External links

 

1992 births
Living people
Filipino footballers
Philippines international footballers
Belgian footballers
Filipino people of Belgian descent
Association football midfielders
Association football defenders
S.V. Zulte Waregem players
Ilocos United F.C. players
Pasargad F.C. players
F.C. Meralco Manila players
Global Makati F.C. players
Ceres–Negros F.C. players